The9 Ltd. is a Shanghai-based online game operator which had the exclusive licence to operate and distribute World of Warcraft in China (launched in June 2005, it has since become the largest online game), a licence it secured after successfully aiding Webzen Games with the distribution of Mu Online in China.  However, in April 2009, Blizzard said that the licence has been moved to NetEase.com.

Current game licences acquired 
Note: In rough order of release.

 Mu Online (the partnership has ended)
 World of Warcraft (the partnership has ended)
 Joyful Journey West
 Guild Wars (Chinese version) (The deal with NCsoft ended prematurely.31 March 2008)
 Soul of the Ultimate Nation
 Granado Espada
 Hellgate: London
 Huxley
 Ragnarok Online 2
 FIFA Online 2
 Atlantica Online
 Free Realms
 PlanetSide 2
 Firefall
Winning Goal

References
Volume 1, Issue 49 of The Escapist, "Red Blindness" by Allen Varney

External links
 The9 Official Website
 The9 Official Website

Companies based in Shanghai
Video game companies of China
Companies listed on the Nasdaq
Internet properties established in 1999
Chinese companies established in 1999